Maccabi Tel Aviv history and statistics, in the FIBA Europe and Euroleague Basketball Company competitions.

European competitions

Worldwide competitions

External links
FIBA Europe
EuroLeague
ULEB
EuroCup

 
Tel Aviv B.C.